Brissalius vannoordenburgi is a species of sea urchin in the Family Brissidae. Their armour is covered with spines. Brissalius vannoordenburgi was first scientifically described in 2008 by Coppard.

See also 

 Brisaster tasmanicus
 Brisaster townsendi
 Brissopsis alta

References 

Animals described in 2008
Brissidae